Bagondine is a village and rural commune in the Brakna Region of southern Mauritania.

In 2000 it had a population of 8933.

References

Bagodine se situe dans la région du brakna et le plus grand village mauritanien

Communes of Brakna Region